Kimberly "Kaydence" Krysiuk is an American songwriter based in Los Angeles, California, United States, formerly of Queens, New York. She has written hit songs for Beyoncé, Ariana Grande, Alina Baraz, Daniel Caesar, H.E.R, Brandy, and more.

Kaydence's works have been nominated for several awards. At the 62nd Annual Grammy Awards, her works were nominated for Record of the Year (Ariana Grande - "7 Rings"), Album of the Year (Ariana Grande - Thank U, Next and H.E.R - I Used to Know Her), and Best R&B Performance (Daniel Caesar feat. Brandy - "Love Again").  She won "Best Pop Vocal Album" for Ariana Grande's Sweetener, and won Best R&B Performance for Beyoncé Black Parade.

At the 2020 BMI Pop Awards, she was recognized for Songwriter of the Most-Performed Songs of the Year ("7 Rings", "Thank U, Next").

Discography

References

American women songwriters
Songwriters from New York (state)
People from Queens, New York
Year of birth missing (living people)
Living people
21st-century American women